Yong-Kang Kim (born January 3, 1965) is a South Korean former professional boxer who competed from 1985 to 1995. He is a two-time flyweight champion, having held the WBC and The Ring titles from 1988 to 1989 and the WBA title from 1991 to 1992.

Professional career 
Kim turned pro in 1985 and captured the WBC and The Ring flyweight titles with a decision win over Sot Chitalada in 1988. He lost his belts in his third defense in a rematch with Chitalada.

In 1991 he won the WBA flyweight title with a decision win over Elvis Álvarez. He defended the belt twice before losing it to Aquiles Guzman in 1992.

In 1994 Kim returned for his biggest fight, for he WBA flyweight title against Saen Sor Ploenchit. The fight was staged a half mile from the Bridge over the River Kwai in Kanchanaburi, Thailand (Kleebbua Stadium or Kanchanaburi Stadium). Over 50,000 fans turned out for the free boxing event. Although Ploenchit was dropped in round one, he went on to easily outbox the former world champion Kim.

Professional boxing record

See also 
 List of lineal boxing world champions
 List of flyweight boxing champions
 List of WBC world champions
 List of WBA world champions

References

External links 
 
 Kim Yong-kang - CBZ Profile

1965 births
Flyweight boxers
Living people
World Boxing Association champions
World Boxing Council champions
World flyweight boxing champions
World boxing champions
South Korean male boxers
Sportspeople from South Jeolla Province